Pieter Dubordieu (1609 in Indre-et-Loire – 1678 in Amsterdam) was a French Baroque portrait painter in the manner of Michiel Jansz Mierevelt.

Biography
According to the RKD, he worked mostly in Leiden. He was studying there in 1628; in 1636 he was spending time in Amsterdam, but was back in Leiden in 1638. He became a member of the Leiden Guild of St. Luke in 1648, 1651, and during the years 1665–1676. His works are in the style of Mierevelt, but not as richly detailed. Some of his portraits were engraved by Dutch and French engravers.

References

1609 births
1678 deaths
French Baroque painters
People from Indre-et-Loire
Painters from Leiden